Henry Augustus Shute (1856–1943) was an American lawyer, judge and writer, who was best known for his "Plupy" stories in The Saturday Evening Post and a series of books.

Biography

Born in Exeter, New Hampshire, Shute was a graduate of Phillips Exeter Academy (1875) and Harvard University (1879). In the 1890s, the Exeter News-Letter began publishing a weekly column of Shute's recollections of his boyhood in Exeter.  These were later self-published by Shute under the titles of Several Hard Characters (1898) and Neighborhood Sketches (1901).

In 1902, his third book, The Real Diary of a Real Boy, provided Shute with national recognition. He went on to write a total of 20 books, including Brite and Fair (1920). His stories were published extensively in The Saturday Evening Post (1925–1928), often illustrated by Leslie Turner.

Additional books include Sequil to the Real Diary (1904), "Real Boys" (1905), Letters to Beany (1905), A Few Neighbors (1906), A Profane and Somewhat Unreliable History of Exeter(1907), The Country Band (1909), A Country Lawyer (1909), Farming It (1909), Plupy the Real Boy (1911), The Misadventures of Three Good Boys (1914), The Youth Plupy or the Lad with the Downy Chin (1917), The Real Diary of the Worst Farmer (1920), Plupy and Old J Albert (1924), Plupy, Beany and Pewt, Contractors (1926), Chadwick & Shute, Gob Printers (1927) and "Plupy, The Wirst Yet" (1929).

External links
 
 
 

20th-century American novelists
American judges
American lawyers
1856 births
1943 deaths
Harvard University alumni
People from Exeter, New Hampshire
Novelists from New Hampshire
Phillips Exeter Academy alumni